Oliver Perry Shiras (October 22, 1833 – January 7, 1916) was the first United States district judge of the United States District Court for the Northern District of Iowa.

Education and career

Born in Pittsburgh, Pennsylvania, Shiras received an Artium Baccalaureus degree in 1853, and an Artium Magister degree in 1856 from Ohio University, and a Bachelor of Laws from Yale Law School in 1856. Relocating to Iowa in 1856, he went into private practice in Dubuque. During the American Civil War, he was in the United States Army, where he served as a First Lieutenant in the JAG Corps from 1862 to 1863. He also served as a Dubuque city councilman.

Federal judicial service

Shiras was nominated by President Chester A. Arthur on August 3, 1882, to the United States District Court for the Northern District of Iowa, to a new seat authorized by 22 Stat. 172. He was confirmed by the United States Senate on August 4, 1882, and received his commission the same day. His service terminated on November 1, 1903, due to his retirement.

Later career and death

Following his retirement from the federal bench, Shiras returned to private practice in Dubuque from 1903 to 1916. He died on January 7, 1916, in Seabreeze, Florida.

References

Sources
 

1833 births
1916 deaths
Iowa city council members
Judges of the United States District Court for the Northern District of Iowa
United States federal judges appointed by Chester A. Arthur
19th-century American judges
United States Army officers
19th-century American politicians